Jalan FELDA Taib Andak, Federal Route 1388, is a federal road in Johor, Malaysia.

At most sections, the Federal Route 1388 was built under the JKR R5 road standard, allowing maximum speed limit of up to 90 km/h.

List of junctions and towns 

Malaysian Federal Roads